Vonabell Sherman is best known as a Home Shopping Network on-air guest since 2001, presenting a wide variety of home and family products.  She is a member of the National Association of Professional Organizers

Vonabell Sherman has been in front of the camera since the age of 13 and did her first commercial at age 16. During her TV career she has appeared in TV, movies and in hundreds of print ads. 

.

References

External links 
Vonabell On-Air Talent

Living people
American television personalities
American women television personalities
Year of birth missing (living people)